The 2017 A-1 League Playoffs was a play-off tournament that decided the winner of the 2016–17 A-1 League. The playoffs started on April 25, 2017 and finished on June 1, 2017. Cedevita won its fourth consecutive title defeating Cibona 3–2 in the final series.

Bracket

Quarterfinals

(1) Šibenik vs. (8) Zagreb

Šibenik won series 2–0

(4) Cibona vs. (5) Zadar 
 

Cibona won series 2–1

(3) Jolly JBŠ vs. (6) Cedevita 

Cedevita won series 2–0

(2) Split vs. (7) Vrijednosnice 
 

Split won series 2–1

Semifinals

(1) Šibenik vs. (5) Cibona 
 

Cibona won series 2–0

(2) Split vs. (6) Cedevita
 

Cedevita won series 2–0

Final

(5) Cibona vs. (6) Cedevita
 
 

Cedevita won series 3–2

References

External links
Official Site 
Scoresway Page
Eurobasket.com League Page

A-1 Liga seasons